The 1969 Hong Kong Urban Council election was held on 5 March 1969 for the five of the ten elected seats of the Urban Council of Hong Kong. 8,178 of 34,392 registered voters voted, the turnout rate was 23.8 per cent, a sharp decline from the record breaking turnout in the previous election in 1967.

All five contested seats were divided up by the two political groups, three of them went to the Hong Kong Civic Association while the other two went to the Reform Club of Hong Kong. All three Civic candidates, Raymond Y. K. Kan, Peter C. K. Chan and Henry Wong were newly elected to the Urban Council.

Outcome

Citations

References
 Lau, Y.W. (2002). A history of the municipal councils of Hong Kong : 1883-1999 : from the Sanitary Board to the Urban Council and the Regional Council. Leisure and Cultural Service Dept. 
 Pepper, Suzanne (2008). Keeping Democracy at Bay:Hong Kong and the Challenge of Chinese Political Reform. Rowman & Littlefield.

Hong Kong municipal
municipal election
Urban
Hong Kong municipal election
Hong Kong municipal election